Chokmah (Hebrew: חָכְמָה ) is the Biblical Hebrew word rendered as "wisdom" in English Bible versions (LXX  sophia, Vulgate ).

The word occurs 149 times in the Masoretic Text of the Hebrew Bible It is cognate with the Arabic word for "wisdom", ḥikma  (Semitic root ). 
Adjectival  "wise" is used as a honorific, as in Talmid Chacham (lit. "student of a sage") for a  Torah scholar, or hakham Bashi for a chief rabbi.

The Talmud (Shabbat 31a) describes knowledge of the Talmudic order of Kodshim as a high level of wisdom, chokhmah. In the Kabbalah, Chokhmah is the uppermost of the sephirot of the right line (kav yamin, the "Pillar of Mercy") in the Tree of Life. 
It is to the bottom right of Keter, with Binah across from it. Under it are the sephirot of Chesed and Netzach. It commonly has four paths going to Keter, Binah, Tifereth, and Chesed (Some kabbalists such as Rabbi Isaac Luria also attributed a path between Chokhmah and Gevurah).

Hebrew Bible

Proverbs personifies Divine Wisdom, which existed before the world was made, revealed God, and acted as God's agent in creation ( cf. 3:19;). Wisdom dwelt with God (cf.) and being the exclusive property of God was as such inaccessible to human beings. It was God who "found" wisdom and gave her to Israel: "He hath found out all the way of knowledge, and hath given it unto Jacob his servant, and to Israel his beloved. Afterward did he shew himself upon earth, and conversed with men.". 

As a female figure (Sir. 1:15; Wis. 7:12), wisdom addressed human beings (Prov. 1:20–33; 8:1–9:6) inviting to her feast those who are not yet wise (Prov. 9:1-6). 
Wisdom 7:22b-8:1 is a famous passage describing Divine Wisdom, including the passage:
"For she is the breath of the power of God, and a pure influence flowing from the glory of the Almighty: therefore can no defiled thing fall into her. For she is the brightness of the everlasting light, the unspotted mirror of the power of God, and the image of his goodness. And being but one, she can do all things: and remaining in herself, she maketh all things new: and in all ages entering into holy souls, she maketh them friends of God, and prophets.". 
Solomon, as the archetypal wise person, fell in love with Wisdom: "I loved her, and sought her out from my youth, I desired to make her my spouse, and I was a lover of her beauty.".

Kabbalah

According to the Bahir: "The second (utterance) is wisdom, as is written: 'Y-H-W-H acquired me at the beginning of His way, before His deeds of old' (Prov 8:22). And there is no 'beginning' but wisdom."

Chokhmah, the second of the ten sefirot, is the first power of conscious intellect within Creation, and the first point of 'real' existence, since Keter represents emptiness. According to the book of Job, "Wisdom comes from nothingness". This point is both infinitely small, and yet encompasses the whole of being, but it remains incomprehensible until it is given shape and form in Binah.

The name of God associated with Chokhmah is Yah. Its associated opposing qliphah is Ghagiel.

Chokhmah  appears in the configuration of the sefirot at the top of the right axis, and corresponds in the tzelem Elokim ("the Divine image") to the left eye, or right hemisphere of the brain.

In its fully articulated form, Chokhmah  possesses two partzufim ("faces" or "features"): the higher of these is referred to as Abba Ila'ah ("the higher father"), whereas the lower is referred to as Yisrael Saba ("Israel, the Elder"). These two partzufim are referred to jointly as Abba ("father").

Chokhmah is associated in the soul with the power of intuitive insight, flashing lightning-like across consciousness. The partzuf of Abba Ila'ah is associated with the power to spontaneously extract such insight from the superconscious realm, whereas the partzuf of Yisrael Saba is associated with the power to subsequently direct it into consciousness.

The "wisdom" of Chokhmah also implies the ability to look deeply at some aspect of reality and abstract its conceptual essence till one succeeds in uncovering its underlying axiomatic truth. These seeds of truth can then be conveyed to the companion power of Binah for the sake of intellectual analysis and development.

Chokhmah is the primary ("beginning") force in the creative process, Creativity, as it is said: "You have made them all with Chokhmah." (Psalms 104:24) The first word of the Torah in Genesis, Breishit means "In the beginning (God created the heavens and the earth)", is translated (Targum Yonatan) as "With Chokhmah (God created…)."

Chokhmah is also called Fear, 'because it has no measure of boundary, and therefore the mind does not have the power to grasp it'. The book of Job states 'Behold the fear of God is wisdom, and to depart from evil is understanding' (Job 28:28).

In the array of sefirot in three columns (gimel kavim), Chokmah is situated at the top of the right column, and corresponds to the right hemisphere of the brain. There are several aspects of Chokhmah:

The word Chokhmah itself may be broken into two words -- koach ("potential") and ma ("what is"). Thus, Chokhmah means "the potential of what is", or, "the potential to be." This aspect of Chokhmah describes the state of Chokhmah in relation to the sefira of Keter. As Chokhmah emanates from Keter, the first dawning of the "Infinite Light", it "appears" in an obscure and undefined state that is a virtual non-being. Thus the verse states, "and Chokhmah emerges from nothingness" (Job 28:12, see Zohar II, 121a, Zohar III, 290a, commentaries). The light of the Ein Sof becomes unified in the world of Atziluth through clothing itself first in the sefira of Chokhmah. In the soul, Chokhmah is associated with the power of intuitive insight.

In the Zohar Chokhmah is the primordial point which shines forth from the will of God and thus, is the starting point of Creation. All things are still undifferentiated at this point and only become intelligible at Binah.

Modern occultism
According to the Hermetic Order of the Golden Dawn, the name of God associated with Chokmah is Jehovah, the archangel that presides over it is Raziel, the order of angels that reside in it are the Ophanim (the wheels), the Heaven of Assiah associated with it is called Mazloth, implying the fulfillment of destiny, and the mundane chakra associated with it is the Zodiac.

In Aleister Crowley's Liber 777, Chokhma is represented as The Four twos of the Tarot, Illuminating, Thoth, Vishnu, Joy, Odin, Uranus, Athena, God the Father, Man, Amaranth, Lingam, Hashish, Phosphorus, Musk, and Yang (not a complete list).

See also
 Sophia (wisdom)
 Holy Wisdom
 Hikmah
 Hakham
 Chabad-Lubavitch (acronym  ChaBaD חבד for  Chokhmah + Binah + Da'at.
 Tales of the Abyss

References

Citations

General sources

Jewish 
 Samuel, Gabriella (2007). The Kabbalah Handbook: A Concise Encyclopedia of Terms and Concepts in Jewish Mysticism. New York: Jeremy P. Tarcher/Penguin. . .
 Bahir, translated by Aryeh Kaplan (1995). Aronson. .
 Lessons in Tanya
 Kabbalah 101: Chochmah 
 Dr. Rabbi-Cohen Shalomim (2005). Developing & Establishing Effective Leadership .

Non-Jewish 
 Aleister Crowley (1955). 777. Red Wheel/Weiser. .
 Dion Fortune (1935). The Mystical Kabbalah. Weiser Books. .

Kabbalistic words and phrases
Sephirot
Wisdom